"I'm Shipping Up to Boston" is a song by the Celtic punk band Dropkick Murphys, with lyrics written by folk singer Woody Guthrie.

The original version of the song was released in 2004 on Give 'Em the Boot IV and was re-recorded for their certified gold selling 2005 album, The Warrior's Code. The song gained worldwide attention for its use in The Departed, which boosted the band's popularity.

The song's lyrics describe a sailor who lost a prosthetic leg climbing the topsail, and is shipping up to Boston to "find my wooden leg." These were taken from a fragment of paper that Ken Casey found while looking through Woody Guthrie's archives. The Dropkick Murphys put music to the lyrics as they did with the song "Gonna Be a Blackout Tonight" from the 2003 album Blackout.

The single is the band's most successful to date and was certified double platinum. It reached No. 1 on the Bubbling Under Hot 100 chart and sold over 1,044,000 digital copies without ever entering the Hot 100 chart.

The video features the Dropkick Murphys performing the song on the waterfront in East Boston. The band is also seen "hanging out" with hooligans while being chased by Boston police officers. The "hanging out" parts were later replaced with footage from The Departed for a second video tying in to the film.

Charts

In other media

In sport
At sporting events, the song is often used as a de facto anthem for Boston.

Rugby
 In rugby union, the song is used as the entrance music for Ireland, Connacht Rugby and formerly London Irish in their home games.

American football
 The New England Patriots frequently use the song during home games. 
 The Dropkick Murphys performed the song live during the NFL kickoff game in 2015 in Foxborough. 
 The Boston College Eagles football team is known to play the song before kick-offs at home games. 
 The Notre Dame Fighting Irish football team is also known to play the song before kick-offs at home games.

Association football
 The German team Greuther Fürth frequently play a German language cover version of the song at home games.

Basketball
 The Boston Celtics frequently use the song during home games.

Ice hockey
 In the National Hockey League, the Boston Bruins frequently use the song, usually during a break in play toward the end of the game or the start of an overtime period. 
 In the National Hockey League, the song is used by the Philadelphia Flyers whenever they are about to start overtime at Wells Fargo Center, followed by a brief playing of "Welcome to the Jungle" by Guns N' Roses.
The song is also used by the Finnish elite league team Helsinki IFK whenever they are about to start overtime at Helsinki Ice Hall.
The Boston University hockey team is known to play the song during games.

Baseball
 The song was used to "pump up the crowd" before Boston Red Sox playoff games during the 2013 season. It was performed on the field by the Dropkick Murphys before game 6 of the 2013 American League Championship Series and game 6 of the 2013 World Series. (The band also performed the national anthem on both occasions.)
 The song was featured on The Boston Pops Orchestra's 2009 album The Red Sox Album.
 Jonathan Papelbon used the song as his entrance music when entering games as a closer in home games played at Fenway Park. Former New York Mets player Daniel Murphy also used it as his entrance music.

Darts
 Northern Irish player Brendan "The History Maker" Dolan uses the song as his walk-on theme in Professional Darts Corporation events.

In film
 It is used heavily in the film The Departed.

In television
 A soundalike version written by James S. Levine is used as the theme for the TV series Rizzoli & Isles.
 The instrumental part of the song was used in episode six of Luck.
 The song is played in the seventh episode of the first season of Mythic Quest: Raven's Banquet and over the end credits of this same episode.
 The song is played in instrumental form in episodes of the Northern Irish comedy series Derry Girls.
 The song is played in the thirteenth episode of the nineteenth season of The Simpsons. An a cappella cover of the song was also performed in the third episode of the twenty-eighth season.
 The song is played in the first episode of the thirteenth season of King of the Hill, "Dia-BILL-ic Shock".
 The song is played in the fourth episode of Kevin Can F**k Himself (as a ringtone).
 An instrumental soundalike is played in the twentieth episode of Be Cool, Scooby-Doo! as chase sequence music.
 An instrumental soundalike is played in the DVD version of the South Park Imaginationland as chase music.

Video games
 The song is provided as downloadable content for the music video games Guitar Hero World Tour and Rock Band 2.
 The Live on Lansdowne, Boston MA version of the song is used in NHL 11 and NHL Slapshot, where it is used on the menus, when goals are scored, and during faceoffs during the game.

Other versions
 The song was covered by Finnish melodic death metal band Children of Bodom, and appeared on their 2012 compilation album Holiday at Lake Bodom.
 The song was covered by Australian children's music group The Wiggles, and appeared on their 2022 album ReWiggled.

References

External links 
 Dropkick Murphys Official Site
 Dropkick Murphys – Warrior's Code
 Midnight String Quartet
 

2005 songs
2006 singles
Hellcat Records singles
Dropkick Murphys songs
Songs written by Woody Guthrie
Songs about Boston
Boston Red Sox
New England Patriots